Benares or Banaras State was a kingdom and later princely state in what is today Uttar Pradesh, India. On 15 October 1948, Benares' last ruler signed the accession to the Indian Union.

The state was founded by the local zamindar, Raja Balwant Singh, who assumed the title of "Raja of Benares" in mid 18th century, taking advantage of the Mughal Empire's disintegration. His descendants ruled  the area around Benares after liberation from awadh and as feudatories East India Company. In 1910, Benares became a full-fledged state of British India. The state was merged in India after India's independence in 1947, but even today the Kashi Naresh (the titular ruler) is highly respected by the people of Varanasi. The Ruler of Benaras was the state’s religious head and the people of Benares considered him to have been ordained the throne of Kashi by Lord Shiva (making him Kashi Naresh by proxy). He was also the chief cultural patron and an essential part of all religious celebrations. In 1948, the 88th ruler of Kashi Sir Vibhuti Narayan Singh accepted the request of the first Indian Prime minister Jawaharlal Nehru and signed the accession to the Indian Union.

History

Princely State
The earliest rulers of the later princely state of Benares were originally zamindars for the Awadh province of the Mughal Empire who later became independent state.

Most of the area currently known as Varanasi was acquired by Mansa Ram, a zamindar of Utaria. Balwant Singh, the ruler of Utaria in 1737, took over the Jagirs of Jaunpur (except Bayalasi which was ruled independently by Zamindar of Purenw), Varanasi, and Chunar, in 1737 from the Mughal Emperor Muhammad Shah of Delhi. The Kingdom of Benaras started in this way during the Mughal dynasty. Other places under the kingship of Kashi Naresh were Chandauli, Gyanpur, Chakia, Latifshah, Mirzapur, Nandeshwar, Mint House and Vindhyachal.

As the Mughal suzerainty weakened, the Benares zamindari estate became Banaras State, thus Balwant Singh of the Narayan dynasty regained control of the territories and declared himself Maharaja of Benares in 1740. The strong clan organisation on which they rested, brought success to the lesser known Hindu princes. There were as many as 100,000 Bhumihar Brahmin clansmen backing the power of the Benares rajas in what later became the districts of Benares, Gorakhpur and Azamgarh. This proved a decisive advantage when the dynasty faced a rival and the nominal suzerain, the Nawab of Oudh, in the 1750s and the 1760s. An exhausting guerrilla war, waged by the Benares ruler against the Oudh camp, using his troops, forced the Nawab to withdraw his main force.

Benares became a princely state in 1911. It was given the privilege of the 13-gun salute.

History of Ramnagar
The residential palace of the Naresh is the Ramnagar Fort at Ramnagar near Varanasi, which is next to the river Ganges.

The Ramnagar Fort was built by Raja Balwant Singh with creamy chunar sandstone in the eighteenth century. It is a typically Mughal style of architecture with carved balconies, open courtyards, and picturesque pavilions.

Kashi Naresh donated over 1,300 acres (5.3 km2) of land on the outskirts of the city to build the campus of Banaras Hindu University.

On 28 January 1983, the Kashi Vishwanath Temple was taken over by the government of Uttar Pradesh and its management was transferred to a trust, with the late Vibhuti Narayan Singh, then Kashi Naresh, as president, and an executive committee with the Divisional Commissioner as chairman.

Ram Leela at Ramnagar
When the Dussehra festivities are inaugurated with a colourful pageant, the Kashi Naresh rides an elephant at the head of the procession. Then, resplendent in silk and brocade, he inaugurates the month-long folk theatre of Ramlila at Ramnagar.

The Ramlila is a cycle of plays which recounts the epic story of Lord Rama, as told in Ramcharitmanas, the version of the Ramayana written by Tulsidas. The plays, sponsored by the Maharaja, are performed in Ramnagar every evening for 31 days. On the last day the festivities reach a crescendo as Rama vanquishes the demon king Ravana. Maharaja Udit Narayan Singh started this tradition of staging the Ramleela at Ramnagar in the mid-nineteenth century.

Over a million pilgrims arrive annually for the vast processions and performances organized by the Kashi Naresh.

Geography
From 1737, the state included most of present-day Bhadohi, Chandauli, Jaunpur, Mirzapur, Sonbhadra, and Varanasi districts, including the city of Varanasi. Balwant Singh expelled Fazl Ali from present-day Ghazipur and Ballia, and added it to his domains.

Between 1775 and 1795, the British gradually took over administration of most of the state, leaving the rajas to directly administer two separate areas – an eastern portion, corresponding to present-day Bhadohi district, and a southern portion, comprising present-day Chakia tehsil of Chandauli district. These two areas made up the princely state of Benares from 1911 to 1948. The rajas retained certain revenues from rents, and certain administrative rights, in the rest of the territory, which the British administered as Benares Division, part of the United Provinces. The rajas made their main residence in Ramnagar.

All India Kashi Raj Trust
Serious work on the Puranas began when the All India Kashiraj Trust was formed under the patronage and guidance of Dr. Vibhuti Narayan Singh, the Maharaja of Kashi, which, in addition to producing critical editions of the Puranas, also published the journal Puranam.

Saraswati Bhawan at Ramnagar Fort
A rare collection of manuscripts, especially religious writings, is housed in Saraswati Bhawan. It includes a precious handwritten manuscript by Goswami Tulsidas. There are also many books illustrated in the Mughal miniature style, with beautifully designed covers.

Vyasa Temple at Ramnagar
Vyasa Kasi, the name by which the temple is called by the people on pilgrimage to Kasi, through ages, is located near Ramnagar. A temple for Sage Vyasa is located here facing Kasi on the opposite side of the river Ganga. The temple is at a distance of 19 km by road from Kasi. Once upon a time, the whole area was covered by a forest of Badari trees. (Badari is called 'Bel' or 'ber' in Hindi, and 'Jujube' in English). Badari is a thorny bush- like tree which gives small sweet and sour fruits. Since Vyasa lived among the Badari trees, he was also called 'Baadarayana' (a person who  moved among the badari bushes). People who go on pilgrimage to Kasi does not fail to visit Vyasa Kasi. They travel through boats that ply on the river Ganga. But when once they reach Vyasa-Kasi, they finish their tour of the place very quickly and return to Kasi before Sunset. Nobody makes a night halt at this place.

Sage Vyasa, who had to live in this forest along with his disciples some 2000–2500 years ago, is also called by other names such as – Veda Vyasa, Krishna Dwaipayana, Paarasarya (son of Rishi Parasara) and Satyavateya (son of mother Satyavati). He had to live there as he was banished from the city of Kasi by Lord Viswanath, the reigning deity of Kasi.According to a popular Puranic story, when Vyasa failed to receive alms in Varanasi, he put a curse on the city. Soon after, at a house where Parvati and Shiva had taken human form as householders, Vyasa was so pleased with the alms he received that he forgot his curse. However, because of Vyasa's bad temper Shiva banished him from Varanasi. Resolving to remain nearby, Vyasa took up residence on the other side of the Ganges, where his temple may still be seen at Ramnagar.

Rulers
The rulers of the state carried the title "Maharaja Bahadur"

Maharaja Bahadurs 
1737–1740 Mansa Ram Singh (d.1740)
1740 – 19 Aug 1770 Balwant Singh (b. 1711 – d. 1770)
19 Aug 1770 – 14 Sep 1781 Chait Singh (b. 17.. – d. 1810)
14 Sep 1781 – 12 Sep 1795 Mahip Narayan Singh (b. 1756 – d. 1795)
12 Sep 1795 –  4 Apr 1835  Udit Narayan Singh (b. 1778 – d. 1835)
4 Apr 1835 – 13 Jun 1889  Ishwari Prasad Narayan Singh (b. 1822 – d. 1889) (
1 Apr 1911 –  4 Aug 1931  Sir Prabhu Narayan Singh (b. 1855 – d. 1931)
4 Aug 1931 –  5 Apr 1939 Aditya Narayan Singh (b. 1874 – d. 1939)
5 Apr 1939 – 15 Aug 1947 Vibhuti Narayan Singh (b. 1927 – d. 2000)

Titular Maharajas
 15 Aug 1947 – 25 Dec 2000: Vibhuti Narayan Singh (b. 1927 – d. 2000)
 25 Dec 2000– present: Anant Narayan Singh

See also
 Narayan dynasty
 Oudh State
 Political integration of India
 Mughal Empire
 Maratha Empire
 Rajputana

References

Bibliography

External links

1740 establishments in India
1948 disestablishments in India
Princely states of Uttar Pradesh
History of Varanasi
States and territories established in 1740
States and territories disestablished in 1948